The Colorado Street Bridge also known as Bridge L-8803 is a masonry and brick arch bridge in Saint Paul, Minnesota's West Side neighborhood. It was designed in 1888 by Andreas W. Munster of the Saint Paul Engineer's Office and is now restricted to pedestrian traffic.

References

External links

Colorado Street Bridge (Bridge L8803)

Arch bridges in the United States
Brick bridges in the United States
Bridges completed in 1888
Bridges in Saint Paul, Minnesota
Former road bridges in Minnesota
National Register of Historic Places in Saint Paul, Minnesota
Pedestrian bridges in Minnesota
Road bridges on the National Register of Historic Places in Minnesota
Skew bridges